Hydrology is the scientific study of the movement, distribution, and quality of water on Earth and other planets.

Hydrology may also refer to:

Hydrology (agriculture), the study of water balance components intervening in agricultural water management
Hydrology (album), by Recoil
Hydrology (MDPI journal), published by MDPI
Hydrology (Science Publishing Group journal), published by Science Publishing Group